Museums on Christmas Island include:

 Administrator's House, Christmas Island
The Chinese Cultural and Heritage Museum

Christmas Island
Christmas Island
Museums